Ochyor, alternatively spelled Ocher, is a town and the administrative center of Ochyorsky District in Perm Krai, Russia, located on the Ochyor River (Kama's tributary),  west of Perm, the administrative center of the krai. Population:

History
The settlement was founded in 1759 in connection with the construction of the Ocher iron foundry and ironworks, owned by Count Stroganov. In 1918, on the site of the old factory, the Ocher Machine-Building Plant was established, which produces bulldozers, pipe-layers, depth-pumping rods, etc. The city industry is represented by a casting-mechanical plant, a food processing plant, a bakery and a dairy plant. In Ocher suburbs there are concentrated deposits of gravel, peat, there are outlets of soda waters.

In 1924 Ocher district was formed. On February 25, 1929 Ocher was granted a status of the settlement, on June 19, 1950 - status of the city.

Administrative and municipal status
Within the framework of administrative divisions, Ochyor serves as the administrative center of Ochyorsky District, to which it is directly subordinated. As a municipal division, the town of Ochyor is incorporated within Ochyorsky Municipal District as Ochyorskoye Urban Settlement.

Archaeology
Near Ochyor, a number of important discoveries of Permian fossil reptiles (especially Therapsids) have been made, beginning in 1952.

References

Notes

Sources

Further reading
Petr Tchudinov 1965, "New Facts about the Fauna of the Upper Permian of the USSR", Journal of Geology, 73:117-30
Everett C. Olson, 1962, Late Permian terrestrial vertebrates, USA and USSR Transactions of the American Philosophical Society, new series, 52: 1–224.
Patricia Vickers-Rich and Thomas H. Rich, The Great Russian Dinosaurs, Guntar Graphics, 1993

Cities and towns in Perm Krai
Okhansky Uyezd
Populated places established in 1759
Paleontological sites of Europe
Monotowns in Russia